The Miami Marine Stadium is a marine stadium on Virginia Key, Miami, Florida, United States. The facility, built and completed in 1963 by the Millman Construction Company of Miami Beach, on land donated to the City of Miami from the Matheson family, is the first stadium purpose-built for powerboat racing in the United States. It was listed on the National Register of Historic Places in 2018.

History
The 6,566-seat stadium was built in 1963 on land donated for water sports, and designed by architect Hilario Candela, then a 28-year-old recent immigrant from Cuba. It was dedicated as the Ralph Munroe Marine Stadium opened, completed at a cost of around $2 million ($ million, adjusted for current inflation). A speed boat racer, James Tapp, was killed on opening day. The venue, located just south of Downtown Miami, was revered for its scenic views of Downtown and Miami Beach, hosting motorboat events, and events featuring the likes of Mitch Miller, Sammy Davis, Jr., and U.S. President Richard Nixon (whose seasonal winter residence, dubbed "the Florida White House", was on nearby Key Biscayne).

In 1979, Miami Rowing Club relocated to an empty lot between the stadium and MAST Academy (then known as Planet Ocean museum). The Miami International Regatta has been hosted by Miami Rowing Club since 1973, the basin provides a 1,500 meter 7 lane course for practice, training and racing.

From its opening for nearly 30 years, the stadium was used for its intended water sports as well as concerts, sporting events such as boxing (which began in 1972), and even figured prominently in the 1967 Elvis Presley film Clambake, serving as the scene of Elvis' climatic speedboat race. In the wake of Hurricane Andrew, it was declared an unsafe building under Miami-Dade County building code on September 18, 1992. In 2004, $3 million was pledged in a municipal bonds by county residents for the restoration and renovation of the facilities.

Facilities 
The Stadium was host for many world class powerboat events including Unlimited Hydroplane, Inboard, Outboard, Performance Craft, Stock, Modified, Grand National divisions as well as other special event races. The Stadium was also the site of a number of nationally televised events including the Orange Bowl Regatta (power boat races), the Bill Muncey Invitational and the ESPN All American Challenge Series. The last major race in the Stadium was the 20th Annual Budweiser Hydroplane Regatta, June 1–3, 1990.

Since its condemnation in 1992, the stadium has become a haven for graffiti artists, but remains an attraction for its photographic panoramic view of the central business districts and barrier islands of Miami.

Design 
Poured entirely in concrete, the Miami Marine Stadium consists of a dramatically cantilevered folded plate roof supported by eight big slanted columns anchored in the ground through the grandstand. A huge horizontal beam tied them all together. A cut in the seating arrangement allowed spectators to appreciate the full height of the posts, which were pushed as far back as possible to permit unobstructed views over the watercourse. This concept was presented by one of the project's architects, Hilaro Candela to be original, however the idea was synonymous to several other well-established stadiums throughout Latin America and Europe, including the Florence Stadium designed by Pier Luigi Nervi, built 1932, the Baseball and Soccer stadiums in Cartagena, Colombia, by Guillermo Gonzalez Zuleta in 1947 and The University Stadium in Caracas designed by Carlos Raul Villanueva, built in 1950. The Miami Marine Stadium bears striking resemblance to the more elegant horse-racing Hipódromo de la Zarzuela in Madrid, Spain, designed by Carlos Arniches Moltó and Martín Domínguez in 1934-1935.

Revitalization 
On April 28, 2009 the National Trust for Historic Preservation named the Commodore Ralph Middleton Munroe Marine Stadium to its list of America's 11 Most Endangered Historic Places and as a National Treasure in March 2012. On April 18, 2012, the Florida Chapter of the American Institute of Architects placed the stadium on its list of Florida Architecture: 100 Years. 100 Places as the Ralph Middleton Munroe Miami Marine Stadium.

A group, Friends of Miami Marine Stadium, was formed in 2008 with the purpose of restoring the Marine Stadium and returning it to operation. Performer Gloria Estefan, through her charity group, is a major contributor to Friends of Miami Marine Stadium. The City of Miami granted control of the stadium property to the group in 2013, and the group returned in late 2014 with a revitalization proposal and supposed funds. This project has brought the Miami Boat Show to the Miami Marine Stadium, and the show will take place February 11–15, 2016.
In the past few years the site has been used for special events, such as The Miami International Boat Show and the 2019 USA Swimming Open Water National Championships.

In 2016, the Miami City Commission voted to approve up to $45 million in revenue-bond financing to restore the stadium. An architecture firm was hired and restoration plans were finalized, but the bond authorization expired. City commissioners were expected to vote on a $61.2 million revenue bond financing on February 24, 2022. The vote was deferred until late May 2022.

References

Bibliography

National Trust for Historic Preservation 2009 
Preservation Magazine  - An Architect and His Stadium
Critical Miami  - Photo of the Stadium from January 2007
Civil Engineering Database - Evaluation of Cracking of the Miami Marine Stadium Hyperbolic Paraboloid Roof Structure
Hibblen Radio - 31 photos taken throughout the structure in August 2006 showing extensive vandalism and cracking
National Trust for Historic Preservation  - America's 11 Most Endangered Historic Places

External links
Friends of Miami Marine Stadium

Sports venues in Miami
Multi-purpose stadiums in the United States
National Register of Historic Places in Miami
Sports venues completed in 1963
1963 establishments in Florida